Intira Airlines (also spelled with "Airline"; formerly Business Air) was charter airline based at Suvarnabhumi Airport in Bangkok, Thailand.

History
Business Air was formed in 2008 to accommodate the tourism industry and other aviation charter services. It was granted the Air Operator License and Air Operator Certificate from Department of Civil Aviation (Thailand) (DCA) in November 2009, permitting international operations, with its first flight on December 2009.

The carrier has since experienced financial difficulties, with the unpaid fees of fuel surcharge, air traffic control services and aircraft lessors for more than 1 billion THB (approx. 30.7 million USD), which cause the DCA to ordered Business Air to suspend its operation on 16 January 2015, leaving more than 1,000 passengers affected. However on 24 January 2015, the Administrative Court of Thailand granted the preliminary injunction, allowing the airline to resume operations in the wake of ongoing liability and litigation. The airline was rebranded as "Intira Airlines" in June 2015 under the new ownership, but never launched.

Destinations
Republic of Korea
Seoul - Incheon International Airport

Saudi Arabia
Jeddah - King Abdulaziz International Airport

Thailand
Bangkok - Suvarnabhumi Airport base
Narathiwat - Narathiwat Airport

Fleet

References

External links

Official Website (Business Air, Intira Airlines)

Charter airlines of Thailand
Airlines established in 2008
Thai companies established in 2008